The Takeover is a studio album by Zion I. It was released by Gold Dust Media in 2009. It peaked at number 36 on the Billboard Heatseekers Albums chart.

Critical reception

At Metacritic, which assigns a weighted average score out of 100 to reviews from mainstream critics, the album received an average score of 58, based on 7 reviews, indicating "mixed or average reviews".

Andres Tardio of HipHopDX gave the album a 2.5 out of 5, writing, "Although they should be applauded for experimentation with different styles, their eagerness to please everyone inevitably took over the album in a negative way." Rachel Swan of East Bay Express called it "a producers' album, wherein all imagination and experimental energy lies in the beats, while the substantive content of the raps ceases to matter."

Track listing

Charts

References

External links
 

2009 albums
Zion I albums